The Vattikuti Urology Institute (VUI) at the Henry Ford Hospital in Detroit, Michigan is a clinical and research center for urological care.

It is known for being the first institute to implement robotic surgery as a type of treatment for patients with prostate cancer. To date, the institute has performed more than 10,000 robotic procedures.

The Vattikuti Urology Institute has been ranked high by the U.S. News & World Report. The VUI addresses nearly 50,000 patients annually.

History 
The Henry Ford Hospital recruited Dr. Mani Menon as department chair in 1997. In 1999, Raj Vattikuti announced a research initiative to help patients with prostate cancer. The University of Michigan, William Beaumont Hospital, and Henry Ford Hospital competed for the funds. Menon's proposal, submitted by Henry Ford Hospital, was to establish an institute to develop techniques of minimally invasive surgery for prostate cancer. This proposal was accepted by the Vattikuti Foundation and the Vattikuti Urology Institute was initialized in 2001.

The Vattikuti Foundation 
The Vattikuti Urology Institute is named after Raj Vattikuti and his wife Padma Vattikuti. The Vattikuti Foundation is a philanthropy organization located in Michigan, founded by the Vattikutis. Vattikuti is also the founder and CEO of Covansys Corporation in Farmington Hills, Michigan.  The Vattikuti Foundation is notable for making the largest philanthropic contribution for cancer research in Michigan. The foundation donated $40 million to the Henry Ford Hospital and the William Beaumont Hospital in 2001. The donation to Henry Ford Hospital was used to support the treatment and the study of prostate cancer, research, and treatment advances.

Chairmen 
 2019–present: Dr. Craig Rogers

References

Urology organizations
Surgical organizations
Cancer hospitals
Computer-assisted surgery
Robotics organizations
Medical associations based in the United States